This is a list of national capitals, ordered according to population. Capitals of dependent territories and disputed territories are marked in italics. The population statistics given refer only to the official capital area, and do not include the wider metropolitan/urban district.

Table
* indicates "Cities of COUNTRY or TERRITORY" links.

See also
Capital city
List of countries whose capital is not their largest city
List of capitals outside the territories they serve
List of national capitals by latitude
List of countries and dependencies by population
List of towns and cities with 100,000 or more inhabitants
List of population concern organizations
List of national capitals
List of national capitals by area

Notes

References

Population
Capitals, national
Lists of cities (worldwide) by population
Capitals, national